The annual Asian Academy Creative Awards are presented every December as part of the Singapore Media Festival.  They recognise excellence in the film and television industry across 16 nations in the Asia-Pacific region.

History 

The inaugural awards were held in December 2018, at the Capitol Theatre, Singapore. The 2019 awards were held in the Victoria Theatre, Singapore. Due to the global covid-19 outbreak, the 2020 awards were held over two nights in a 'virtual theatre,' where each nation represented held their own ceremony in conjunction with the main event in Singapore.

2021 awards were held in Singapore from December 2 and 3, for nominations announced on October 4, 2021. 38 awards were given to winners of Asian-made TV and streaming content in various categories.

Award 

The winner of each category receives the 'Golden Goddess' statue. The statue stands at 36cms (14 inches) and was designed by Society Awards, New York.

Award winners

Grand Final Winners

Categories

Major categories 
Best Feature Film
Best Drama Series
Best Documentary Programme (one-off)
Best Documentary Series
Best Actor in a Leading Role
Best Actress in a Leading Role
Best Actor in a Supporting Role
Best Actress in a Supporting Role
Best Single Drama/Telemovie/Anthology Episode

Television 
Best Current Affairs Programme or Series
Best Branded Programme or Series
Best Children’s Programme (one-off / series)
Best General Entertainment, Game or Quiz Programme
Best Infotainment Programme
Best Lifestyle, Entertainment Presenter/Host
Best Lifestyle Programme

News 
Best News or Current Affairs Presenter/Anchor
Best News Programme
Best Single News Story/Report

Comedy 
Best Comedy Performance
Best Comedy Programme

Technical 
Best Direction (Fiction)
Best Direction (Non-Fiction)
Best Cinematography
Best Editing
Best Sound
Best Animated Programme or Series (2D or 3D)

All media 
Best Non Scripted Entertainment
Best Original Screenplay
Best Original Programme by a Streamer/OTT
Best Preschool Programme
Best Promo or Trailer
Best Short Form Content
Best Natural History or Wildlife Programme
Best Theme Song (or Title Theme)
Best Visual or Special FX  (TV or Feature Film)
Best Voice Artist
Best Adaptation of an Existing Format

Patrons 
 Warner Media - Foundation Patron
 Facebook - Patron
 ABS-CBN Entertainment - Patron

See also 
Lists of film awards

References 

 
Asian-American cinema
Awards established in 2018